Gloucester is a city in Essex County, Massachusetts, in the United States. It sits on Cape Ann and is a part of Massachusetts's North Shore. The population was 29,729 at the 2020 U.S. Census. An important center of the fishing industry and a popular summer destination, Gloucester consists of an urban core on the north side of the harbor and the outlying neighborhoods of Annisquam, Bay View, Lanesville, Folly Cove, Magnolia, Riverdale, East Gloucester, and West Gloucester.

History

The boundaries of Gloucester originally included the town of Rockport, in an area dubbed "Sandy Bay". The village separated formally from Gloucester on February 27, 1840. In 1873, Gloucester was reincorporated as a city.

Contact period 
Native Americans inhabited what would become northeastern Massachusetts for thousands of years prior to the European colonization of the Americas. At the time of contact, the area was inhabited by Agawam people under sachem Masconomet. Evidence of a village exists on Pole's Hill in the current Riverdale neighborhood.

In 1606 Samuel de Champlain explored the harbor, and produced the first known map of Gloucester harbor titling it 'le Beau port'. This map suggests substantial Native American settlement on the shores of the harbor. In 1614 John Smith again explored the area, identifying the indigenous inhabitants as Aggawom. In 1623 men from the Dorchester Company established a permanent fishing outpost in the area.

At the Cape Ann settlement a legal form of government was established, and from that Massachusetts Bay Colony sprung.  Roger Conant was the governor under the Cape Ann patent, and as such, has been called the first governor of Massachusetts.

Life in this first settlement was harsh and it was short-lived. Around 1626 the place was abandoned, and the people removed themselves to Naumkeag (in what is now called Salem, Massachusetts), where more fertile soil for planting was to be found. The meetinghouse and governor's house were even disassembled and relocated to the new place of settlement.

Second English Settlement 

At some point in the following years—though no record exists—the area was slowly resettled by English colonists. The town was formally incorporated in 1642. It is at this time that the name "Gloucester" first appears on tax rolls, although in various spellings. The town took its name from the city of Gloucester in southwest England, perhaps from where many of its new occupants originated but more likely because Gloucester, England, was a Parliamentarian stronghold, successfully defended with the aid of the Earl of Essex against the King in the Siege of Gloucester of 1643.

This new permanent settlement focused on the Town Green area, an inlet in the marshes at a bend in the Annisquam River. This area is now the site of Grant Circle, a large traffic rotary at which Massachusetts Route 128 mingles with a major city street (Washington Street/Rt 127). Here the first permanent settlers built a meeting house and therefore focused the nexus of their settlement on the "Island" for nearly 100 years. Unlike other early coastal towns in New England, development in Gloucester was not focused around the harbor as it is today, rather it was inland that people settled first. This is evidenced by the placement of the Town Green nearly two miles from the harbor-front.

The Town Green is also where the settlers built the first school. By Massachusetts Bay Colony Law, any town with 100 families or more had to provide a public schoolhouse. This requirement was met in 1698, with Thomas Riggs standing as the town's first schoolmaster.

In 1700, the selectmen of Gloucester recognized the claim of Samuel English, grandson of Agawam sachem Masconomet, to the land of the town, and paid him seven pounds for the quitclaim.

The White-Ellery House was erected in 1710 upon the Town Green. It was built at the edge of a marsh for Gloucester's first settled minister, the Reverend John White (1677–1760).

Early industry included subsistence farming and logging. Because of the poor soil and rocky hills, Cape Ann was not well suited for farming on a large scale. Small family farms and livestock provided the bulk of the sustenance to the population. Fishing, for which the town is known today, was limited to close-to-shore, with families subsisting on small catches as opposed to the great bounties yielded in later years. The fishermen of Gloucester did not command the Grand Banks until the mid-18th century.  Historian Christine Heyrman, examining the town's society between 1690 and 1750, finds that at the beginning community sensibility was weak in a town that was a loose agglomeration of individuals. Commerce and capitalism transformed the society, making it much more closely knit with extended families interlocking in business relationships.

Early Gloucestermen cleared great swaths of the forest of Cape Ann for farm and pasture land, using the timber to build structures as far away as Boston. The rocky moors of Gloucester remained clear for two centuries until the forest reclaimed the land in the 20th century. The inland part of the island became known as the "Commons", the "Common Village", or "Dogtown". Small dwellings lay scattered here amongst the boulders and swamps, along roads that meandered through the hills. These dwellings were at times little more than shanties; only one was even two stories tall. Despite their size, several generations of families were raised in such houses. One feature of the construction of these houses was that under one side of the floor was dug a cellar hole (for the keeping of food), supported by a foundation of laid-stone (without mortar). These cellar holes are still visible today along the trails throughout the inland part of Gloucester; they, and some walls, are all that remain of the village there.

Growth

The town grew, and eventually colonists lived on the opposite side of the Annisquam River. In a time of legally mandated church attendance this was a long way to walk—or row—on a Sunday morning. In 1718 the settlers on the opposite shore of the river split off from the First Parish community at the Green and formed "Second Parish". While still part of the town of Gloucester, the people of Second, or "West", Parish now constructed their own meetinghouse and designated their own place of burial, both of which were in the hills near the marshes behind Wingaersheek Beach. The meetinghouse is gone now, but deep in the woods on the Second Parish Road, Old Thompson road, one can still find the stone foundation and memorial altar, as well as scattered stones of the abandoned burial ground.

Other parts of town later followed suit. Third Parish, in northern Gloucester, was founded in 1728. Fourth Parish split off from First Parish in 1742. Finally, in 1754, the people of Sandy Bay (what would later be called Rockport) split off from First Parish to found Fifth Parish. The Sandy Bay church founding was the last religious re-ordering of the colonial period. All of these congregations still exist in some form, with the exception of Fourth Parish, the site of whose meeting house is now a highway.

At one time, there was a thriving granite industry in Gloucester. English writer Harriet Martineau, who visited Gloucester during her travels in the United States in the mid-1830s, commented on the ubiquity of granite there:It has great wealth of granite and fish. It is composed of granite; and almost its only visitors are fish. **** The houses look as if they were squeezed in among the rocks. The granite rises straight behind a house, encroaches on each side, and overhangs the roof, leaving space only for a sprinkling of grass about the door, for a red shrub or two to wave from a crevice, and a drip of water to flow down among gay weeds. Room for these dwellings is obtained by blasting the rocks. Formerly, people were frightened at fragments falling through the roof after a blasting: but now, it has become too common an occurrence to alarm any body.

Geography and transportation

Gloucester is located at  (42.624015, −70.675521).

Gloucester occupies most of the eastern end of Cape Ann, except for the far tip, which is the town of Rockport. The city is split in half by the Annisquam River, which flows northward through the middle of the city into Ipswich Bay. At its south end it is connected to Gloucester Harbor by the Blynman Canal. The land along the northwestern shore of the river is marshy, creating several small islands. Gloucester Harbor is divided into several smaller coves, including the Western Harbor (site of the Fisherman's Memorial) and the Inner Harbor (home to the Gloucester fishing fleet).  The eastern side of Gloucester Harbor is divided from the rest of Massachusetts Bay by Eastern Point, extending some  outward from the mainland. There are several parks in the city, the largest of which are Ravenswood Park, Stage Fort Park and Mount Ann Park.

Gloucester lies between Ipswich Bay to the north and Massachusetts Bay to the south. The city is bordered on the east by Rockport, and on the west by Ipswich, Essex and Manchester-by-the-Sea to the west. (The town line with Ipswich is located across Essex Harbor, and as such there is no land connection between the towns.) Gloucester lies at the eastern terminus of Route 128, which ends at Route 127A. Route 127A begins at Route 127 just east of the Route 128 terminus, heading into Rockport before terminating there. Route 127 enters from Manchester-by-the-Sea before crossing the Blynman Canal and passing through downtown towards Rockport. It then re-enters Gloucester near Folly Cove, running opposite of its usual north–south orientation towards its terminus at Route 128. Route 133 also terminates within the city, entering from Essex and terminating just west of the Blynman Canal at Route 127. Besides the bridge over the Blynman Canal, there are only two other connections between the eastern and western halves of town, the A. Piatt Andrew Memorial Bridge, carrying Route 128, and the Boston & Maine Railroad Bridge, just north of the Blynman Canal.

Gloucester is home to the Cape Ann Transportation Authority, which serves the city and surrounding towns. Two stops (in West Gloucester and in downtown Gloucester) provide access to the Newburyport/Rockport Line of the MBTA Commuter Rail, which extends from Rockport along the North Shore to Boston's North Station. The nearest airport is the Beverly Municipal Airport, with the nearest national and international air service being at Boston's Logan International Airport.

Demographics

 
As of the 2000 census, there were 30,273 people, 12,592 households, and 7,895 families residing in the city. The racial makeup of the city was 96.99% White, 0.61% African American, 0.72% Asian, 0.12% Native American, 0.02% Pacific Islander, 0.50% from other races, and 1.03% from two or more races. Hispanic or Latino of any race were 1.48% of the population. 22.6% were of Italian, 16.2% Irish, 11.1% English, 8.5% Portuguese and 7.1% American ancestry according to Census 2000.

There were 12,592 households, out of which 27.6% had children under the age of 18 living with them, 48.8% were married couples living together, 10.6% had a female householder with no husband present, and 37.3% were non-families. 30.7% of all households were made up of individuals, and 11.4% had someone living alone who was 65 years of age or older. The average household size was 2.38 and the average family size was 3.00.

In the city, the population was spread out, with 22.0% under the age of 18, 6.5% from 18 to 24, 29.9% from 25 to 44, 26.1% from 45 to 64, and 15.6% who were 65 years of age or older. The median age was 40 years. For every 100 females, there were 92.0 males. For every 100 females age 18 and over, there were 88.8 males.

The median income for a household in the city was $58,568, and the median income for a family was $80,970 from a 2007 estimate. Males had a median income of $41,465 versus $30,566 for females. The per capita income for the city was $25,595. About 7.1% of families and 8.8% of the population were below the poverty line, including 11.8% of those under age 18 and 11.2% of those age 65 or over.

Politics

Gloucester is a city, with a strong mayor-council system. The current mayor of Gloucester is Gregory P. Verga as of January 2022. The Mayor is also reserved a seat on the School Committee. City offices are elected every two years (those ending with odd numbers). In 2007 over 40 people ran for the 15 elected seats in the city's government.

The city is divided into five Wards, each split into two precincts: 
 Ward 1: East Gloucester – includes Eastern Point and Rocky Neck
 Ward 2: Downtown and the Harbor area
 Ward 3: The western edge of the "island" from Stacy Boulevard to Wheeler's Point – includes the Heights at Cape Ann and Pond View Village.
 Ward 4: North Gloucester – includes Riverdale, Annisquam, Bay View, and Lanesville.
 Ward 5: The entirety of West Gloucester west of the Annisquam River and Blynman Canal to Manchester-by-the-Sea and Essex – includes the Wingaersheek area and village of Magnolia.

As late as the mid-20th century Gloucester had as many as eight wards, but they have been since reorganized into current number.

On November 7, 2005, incumbent Mayor John Bell was re-elected to a third term in office. He stated his intention not to run for reelection and stepped down in January 2008.

On November 6, 2007, Carolyn Kirk was elected as the Mayor of Gloucester. Kirk resigned in December 2014 to take a position in the administration of Massachusetts governor Charlie Baker. Sefatia Theken was then voted to be the interim mayor of Gloucester by the City Council. Theken was elected to serve a full two-year term on November 2, 2015, and re-elected again in 2017 and 2019. She was defeated for re-election in 2021 by Gregory P. Verga.

Education
The following schools are located within the Gloucester Public Schools District:
 Gloucester High School (9–12)
 O'Maley Innovation Middle School (6–8)
 East Gloucester Elementary School (K–5)
 Plum Cove Elementary School (K–5)
 Beeman Elementary School (K–5)
 Veteran's Memorial School (K–5)
 West Parish Elementary School (K–5) (site of the West Parish Elementary School Science Park)
 Gloucester Preschool

Economy
Gorton's of Gloucester, Mighty Mac, Gloucester Engineering, Good Harbor Consulting, Para Research, Aid-Pack, Cyrk, and Varian Semiconductor are among the companies based in Gloucester.

Gloucester and the sea
The town was an important shipbuilding center, and the first schooner was reputedly built there in 1713. The community developed into an important fishing port, largely due to its proximity to Georges Bank and other fishing banks off the east coast of Nova Scotia and Newfoundland. Gloucester's most famous (and nationally recognized) seafood business was founded in 1849 as John Pew & Sons. It became Gorton-Pew Fisheries in 1906, and in 1957 changed its name to Gorton's of Gloucester. The iconic image of the "Gorton's Fisherman", and the products he represents, are known throughout the country and beyond. Besides catching and processing seafood, Gloucester is also a center for research on marine life and conservation ; Ocean Alliance is headquartered in the city.

In the late 19th century Gloucester saw an influx of Portuguese and Italian immigrants seeking work in the town's flourishing fishing industry and a better life in America. Some present-day fishermen of Gloucester are descendants of these early immigrants. The strong Portuguese and Italian influence is evident in the many festivals celebrated throughout the year. During the Catholic celebration, St Peter's Fiesta, relatives of fishermen past and present carry oars representing many of the fishing vessels which call Gloucester their home. Saint Peter is the patron saint of the fishermen. Gloucester remains an active fishing port, and in 2013 ranked 21st in the United States with respect to fish landings. In that year 62 million pounds of fish were caught bringing in an estimated $42 million.

Arts

Painting and printmaking

Gloucester's scenic beauty, active fishing industry, and renowned arts community have attracted and inspired painters since the early 19th century, as they do today. The first Gloucester painter of note was native-born Fitz Henry Lane, whose home still exists on the waterfront. The premier collection of his works is in the Cape Ann Museum, which holds 40 of his paintings and 100 of his drawings. Other painters subsequently attracted to Gloucester include William Morris Hunt, Winslow Homer, Childe Hassam, John Twachtman, Frederick Mulhaupt, Frank Duveneck, Cecilia Beaux, Jane Peterson, Gordon Grant, Harry DeMaine, Emile Gruppe, Stuart Davis, Joseph Solman, Mark Rothko, Milton Avery, Barnett Newman, William Meyerowitz, Joan Lockhart, Theresa Bernstein, and Marsden Hartley, and artists from the Ashcan School such as Edward Hopper, John Sloan, Robert Henri, William Glackens, and Maurice Prendergast.

Smith Cove is home to the Rocky Neck Art Colony, the oldest art colony in the country. Folly Cove was the home of the Folly Cove Designers, influential to this day in print design and technique.

Sculpture

Several important sculptors have lived and worked in East Gloucester, Annisquam, Lanesville and Folly Cove. They include George Aarons, Anna Hyatt Huntington, Charles Grafly, Paul Manship and his daughter-in-law Margaret Cassidy Manship, Walker Hancock, and George Demetrios. In addition, Aristides Demetrios grew up in Folly Cove.

Literature

Captains Courageous (1897) by Rudyard Kipling was set in Gloucester, and adapted as a 1937 movie starring Spencer Tracy.
T. S. Eliot (1888–1965) summered at the family house near Eastern Point in his early years. This house is now owned by the TS Eliot Foundation and used as a writer's retreat. Eliot drew great inspiration from Gloucester, and his early poems were collected in a notebook purchased from Procters on Main Street, and now part of the Berg Collection at the New York City Public Library. One of his Four Quartets is entitled The Dry Salvages, the rocks off the N.E. coast of Gloucester.
Charles Olson (1910–1970), a poet and teacher at Black Mountain College in North Carolina, composed a 635-page poem known as The Maximus Poems, which centered on Gloucester.
Gloucester is often referred to in the works of horror writer H. P. Lovecraft. The fictional town of Innsmouth in Lovecraft's The Shadow Over Innsmouth is believed partially based on Cape Ann as a whole and Gloucester in particular.
The book, The Perfect Storm, which recounted a massive storm of 1991, had figures based in the town. Scenes from the film adaptation by the same name were filmed there. 
Gloucester and its coast guard station are the center of the land action in Michael J. Tougias' 2005 book Ten Hours Until Dawn, recounting the loss of the pilot boat Can Do and its crew during the blizzard of 1978.
 Gloucesterbook, Gloucestertide, and Gloucestermas are three novels in the Gloucesterman series by Gloucester novelist Jonathan Bayliss set in Gloucester, fictionalized as "Dogtown" on "Cape Gloucester".
 Hersenschimmen (Out of Mind), a 1984 novel by J. Bernlef, is set in Gloucester.
 Anita Diamant has set two novels in Gloucester, The Last Days of Dogtown and Good Harbor.

Comics

Gloucester is the birthplace of Marvel character Dane Whitman whose superhero alter ego is the Black Knight.

Film

 Author! Author! had scenes shot on Good Harbor Beach in Gloucester.
 In The Bostonians, oceanfront scenes were filmed on rocks at Rafes Chasm Park, off Hesperus Avenue.
 Captains Courageous was set in Gloucester.
 The Gloucester 18 is a documentary film that investigates the Gloucester pregnancy pact, and was filmed entirely in Gloucester.
 The Good Son was filmed in Gloucester and other Cape Ann communities.
Grown Ups
Manchester by the Sea much of which was filmed in Gloucester.
 Mermaids had scenes shot in the Magnolia area of Gloucester.
 Moonlight Mile was filmed almost entirely in Gloucester, with some shots in Marblehead.
 The Perfect Storm was filmed and set in Gloucester.
 Polis is This: Charles Olson and the Persistence of Place is a one-hour documentary about the poet Charles Olson which the Boston Phoenix called "the best film about an American poet ever made."
 Portions of Stuck on You were filmed in Gloucester and in neighboring Rockport.  (The rink scenes were filmed at the O'Maley School.)
The Women was partly filmed in Annisquam.
 The Russians Are Coming, the Russians Are Coming film takes place on a fictional Gloucester island but was filmed in Mendocino, California.
 One Step Beyond Episode 19, "The Captain's Guests", takes place on "Cape Ann Road" set in Gloucester. 
 Clear History takes place on an island in New England, but was filmed in Gloucester and around Cape Ann.
The 2021 film CODA is based and was shot in Gloucester.

Television

National Geographic Channel films its reality television series Wicked Tuna, documenting and chronicling the lives of commercial tuna fishermen, and the lucrative bluefin tuna industry, in Gloucester.

Route 66 season 2, episode 6, "Once To Every Man" (October 27, 1961) was set and filmed in Gloucester.

Bewitched season 7, episode 5, "Darrin On A Pedestal" (October 22, 1970) was set and partially filmed on Gloucester.

Spenser: For Hire, season 2, episode 1, "Widow's Walk" (October 4, 1986) was set and filmed in Gloucester.

Theater 
The Gloucester Stage Company stages five to eight plays each season, primarily in the summer months. Located in East Gloucester, the theatre sits at water's edge overlooking Smith's Cove. It was founded in 1979 by local arts and business leaders to encourage playwrights and their new works. Israel Horovitz, who founded the GSC, was also its artistic director from 1979 to 2006. Over the years, plays developed at the Gloucester Stage Company have gone on to critical acclaim and popular success, on and off Broadway, nationally and internationally. The group draws theatre-goers from Gloucester, neighboring North Shore districts, and the greater Boston area, as well as seasonal residents and tourists.

Architecture
The city has much significant architecture, from pre-Revolutionary houses to the hilltop 1870 City Hall, which dominates the town and harbor. It also has exotic waterfront homes now converted to museums, including Beauport, built 1907–1934 by designer Henry Davis Sleeper in collaboration with local architect Halfdan Hanson, said to raise eclecticism to the level of genius. In addition, it has Hammond Castle, built 1926–1929 by inventor John Hays Hammond, Jr., as a setting for his collection of Roman, medieval and Renaissance artifacts. Gloucester was also the home of feminist writer Judith Sargent Murray and John Murray, the founder of the first Universalist Church in America. Their house still exists as the Sargent House Museum. Many museums are located in the main downtown area, such as the Cape Ann Museum, and the museum/aquarium Maritime Gloucester.

Points of interest

 The schooner Adventure
 Annisquam
 Cape Ann Museum
 Dogtown Common
 Norman's Woe, known for several shipwrecks, including The Wreck of the Hesperus
 Ravenswood Park
 Rocky Neck Art Colony, America's oldest working art colony
 Sargent House Museum
 Stage Fort Park
 White-Ellery House
Gloucester's most noted landmark is the harborside Man at the Wheel statue (also known as the "Gloucester Fisherman's Memorial Cenotaph"), dedicated to "They that go down to the sea in ships", which is a quote from Psalm 107:23–32.

Gloucester's largest annual event is St. Peter's Fiesta, sponsored by the local Italian-American community. It is held the last weekend in June, which is typically the weekend closest to the saint's feast day. Preceded by a nine-day novena of prayers, the festival highlights include the blessing of the fleet and the greasy pole contest.

Notable people

 Sylvester Ahola, jazz trumpeter and cornetist
 Willie Alexander, singer and keyboard player, formerly of the Lost, the Bagatelle, the Grass Menagerie and the Boom Boom Band, before briefly becoming a member of The Velvet Underground, was raised and is based in Gloucester; much of his later work involves collaborations in various media with area's rich arts community
 A. Piatt Andrew, congressman, Assistant Treasury Secretary, and Harvard professor; The Route 128 bridge connecting the island and mainland portions of Gloucester was named after him
 Roger Babson, founder of Babson College and presidential candidate for Prohibition Party in 1940
 Walworth Barbour, diplomat, lived for many years in Gloucester
 Thomas P. Barnett, painter
 Jonathan Bayliss, novelist and playwright
 Cecilia Beaux, painter and society portraitist
 Howard Blackburn, fisherman and adventurer
 Nell Blaine, painter
 Clarence Birdseye, founder of modern frozen food industry
 Kyle Bochniak, MMA Fighter
 Phil Bolger, prolific 20th-century boat designer with 668 designs to his credit, designed Canadian-built tall ship HMS Rose later renamed  for use in Master and Commander: The Far Side of the World
 Hugo Burnham, drummer and founding member of British post-punk band Gang of Four
 Virginia Lee Burton (1909–1968), children's book author and illustrator (The Little House and Mike Mulligan and His Steam Shovel), founder of the Folly Cove Designers group
 Roger Conant, first governor of the Cape Ann colony, moved the colony's center from the Gloucester area to Salem
 Carleton S. Coon, physical anthropologist and president of the American Association of Physical Anthropologists
 Roger Cressey, former member of United States National Security Council, terrorism analyst for NBC News, president of Good Harbor Consulting, and adjunct professor at Georgetown University
 Thomas Dalton, abolitionist leader
 Aristides Demetrios, sculptor, grew up in Gloucester as son of Virginia Lee Burton
 James Elliot, author and United States Representative from Vermont
 Henry Ferrini, critically acclaimed independent filmmaker, nephew of Vincent Ferrini
 Vincent Ferrini, poet, first Poet Laureate of Gloucester
 Thomas Gardner, landed in 1624 at Cape Ann to form colony at what is now known as Gloucester
 Gregory Gibson, author of Goneboy: a Walkabout, Demon of the Waters and Hubert's Freaks
 Raymond Greenleaf, actor
 Emil Gruppe, painter
 John Hays Hammond, Jr., inventor known as "The Father of Radio Control", built Hammond Castle as his home and laboratory
 Halfdan M. Hanson, architect, most noted for collaboration with Henry Davis Sleeper on Beauport, Sleeper-McCann House
 Walker Hancock, sculptor
Sterling Hayden, actor and writer
 Helen Hayes, actor, spent her summers in Annisquam
 Winslow Homer, landscape painter and printmaker, lived and painted in Gloucester in 1870s
 Israel Horovitz, playwright and father of Adam Horovitz of Beastie Boys
 Alpheus Hyatt, naturalist and paleontologist
 Anna Hyatt Huntington, animalier sculptor and daughter of Alpheus Hyatt
 Elliott Jaques, psychoanalyst, social scientist, known for coining term "mid-life crisis"; moved to Gloucester in 1991 and lived there until death in 2003
 Alfred "Centennial" Johnson, first recorded single-handed crossing of Atlantic Ocean
 Hilton Kramer, art critic and essayist, was born in, and grew up in, Gloucester
 Fitz Henry Lane, Luminist painter, born and lived in Gloucester
 Paul Manship, sculptor
 Stuffy McInnis, Major League Baseball player and manager, Harvard baseball coach
 Tony Millionaire, artist and animator best known for comic strip Maakies and Cartoon Network's Drinky Crow Show
 Shawn Milne, Cyclist
 William Monahan, Academy Award-winning screenwriter
 Sun Myung Moon, leader of the Unification Church, spent a great deal of time in Gloucester, and the Unification Church at one time owned a large amount of waterfront property
 Richard Murphy, schooner captain
 John Murray, founder of Universalist denomination in the United States
 Judith Sargent Murray, feminist, essayist, playwright, and poet
 Laura Nyro, singer and songwriter, lived in Gloucester for a number of years
 Charles Olson, Black Mountain College poet
 Kris Osborn, former CNN commentator and current columnist for various military industry blogs
 Mark Parisi, author of syndicated comic strip Off the Mark, was born in Gloucester
 Cy Perkins, Major League Baseball catcher
 Herb Pomeroy, jazz musician, born in Gloucester
 Jessie Ralph, actress
 Marc Randazza, First Amendment lawyer, legal news commentator, columnist (Fox News and CNN)
 Russ Russo, actor
 Daniel Sargent, merchant, politician
 Epes Sargent, editor, poet and playwright
 Henry Sargent, painter and military man
 Paul Dudley Sargent, Revolutionary War hero, one of founding overseers of Bowdoin College
 Winthrop Sargent, patriot, governor, politician, writer; member of Federalist party
 Ben Smith, Olympic ice hockey coach, son of Benjamin A. Smith II, born in Gloucester
 Benjamin A. Smith II, U.S. senator from Massachusetts (1960–1962), Mayor of Gloucester (1954–1955)
 William Stacy (1734–1802), Revolutionary War officer, pioneer to Ohio Country
 Vermin Supreme, performance artist, anarchist, politician, and activist (perennial presidential candidate) 
 Martin Weitzman, economist, lived in Gloucester
 Martin Welch, schooner captain, winner of first International Fishing Schooner Championship Races
 Philip Saltonstall Weld, famed sailor and newspaper publisher
 Anna Maria Wells, poet and writer for children

References

Further reading

Anastas, Peter and Parsons, Peter. When Gloucester Was Gloucester: Toward An Oral History Of The City (1973), Harvard University Press.  Published for the 350th Anniversary Celebration of the City
 Clark, Margaret Elwyn. "Managing uncertainty: Family, religion, and collective action among fishermen's wives in Gloucester, Massachusetts." in Jane Nadel-Klein and Dona Lee Davis, eds. To Work and to Weep: Women in Fishing Economies (1988) pp: 261–278.
 Connolly, James Brendan. The Port of Gloucester (1940)
 Heyrman, Christine. Commerce and Culture: The Maritime Communities of Colonial Massachusetts, 1690–1750 (1986)
 Meltzer, Michael. The world of the small commercial fishermen: their lives and their boats (1980)
 Miller, Marc L., and John Van Maanen. "'Boats Don't Fish, People Do': Some Ethnographic Notes on the Federal Management of Fisheries in Gloucester." Human Organization 38.4 (1979): 377–385.
 Otto, Peter, and Jeroen Struben. "Gloucester fishery: insights from a group modeling intervention." System Dynamics Review 20.4 (2004): 287–312. online
Thomas, Gordon W.  Fast and Able: Life Stories of Great Gloucester Fishing Vessels (1952)

External links

 City of Gloucester official website
 
 1872 Map of Gloucester plate 80–81 Atlas of Essex County published 1872.
 1872 Map of Gloucester Center – Inner Harbor plate 83 Atlas of Essex County published 1872.
 
Gloucester's Civil War monuments at Massachusetts Civil War Monuments Project

 
1623 establishments in Massachusetts
Articles containing video clips
Cities in Essex County, Massachusetts
Cities in Massachusetts
Populated coastal places in Massachusetts
Populated places established in 1623
Port cities and towns in Massachusetts